The 1945 All-Pacific Coast football team consists of American football players chosen by various organizations for All-Pacific Coast teams for the 1945 college football season. The organizations selecting teams in 1945 included the Associated Press (AP) and the United Press (UP).

The USC Trojans won the Pacific Coast Conference (PCC) championship with a 7–4 record, finished the season ranked #11 in the final AP Poll, and had two players named to the first team by either the AP or UP: end Jim Callanan (AP, UP) and halfback Ted Teannehill (AP).

The Washington State Cougars finished in second place in the PCC with a 6–2–1 record and also placed two players on the first team: fullback Bill Lippincott (UP) and tackle Rod Giske (AP, UP).

Four players from teams outside the PCC received first-team honors. Three of those played for the St. Mary's Gaels: quarterback Herman Wedemeyer (AP, UP), halfback "Spike" Cordeiro (UP), and end Ed Ryan (AP, UP). The fourth was tackle Bob McClure (UP) of Nevada.

All-Pacific Coast selections

Quarterbacks
 Jake Leicht, Oregon (AP-1; UP-1)

Halfbacks
 Herman Wedemeyer, St. Mary's (AP-1; UP-1) (College Football Hall of Fame)
 Ted Tannehill, USC (AP-1 [back])
 Cal Rossi, UCLA (AP-1 [back])

Fullbacks
 Bill Lippincott, Washington State (UP-1)

Ends
 Jim Callanan, USC (AP-1; UP-1)
 Ed Ryan, St. Mary's (AP-1; UP-1)

Tackles
 Rod Giske, Washington State (AP-1; UP-1)
 Wendell Beard, California (AP-1)
 Bob McClure, Nevada (UP-1)

Guards
 Alf Hemstad, Washington (AP-1; UP-1)
 Al Sparlis, UCLA (AP-1; UP-1) (College Football Hall of Fame)

Centers
 Bill McGovern, Washington (AP-1; UP-1)

Key

AP = Associated Press

UP = United Press

Bold = Consensus first-team selection of both the AP and UP

See also
1945 College Football All-America Team

References

All-Pacific Coast Football Team
All-Pacific Coast football teams
All-Pac-12 Conference football teams